Allotoma is a genus of moths in the superfamily Bombycoidea. The only species in the genus is Allotoma cornifrons, found in Borneo, Malaysia, and Sumatra.

The puzzling genus has been shuffled between the Notodontidae and Lymantriidae families without certainty of its correct classification.  Holloway ruled out Noctuoidea and hypothesized that it may belong in the Bombycoidea superfamily without placing it more precisely.

References

Natural History Museum Lepidoptera genus database https://web.archive.org/web/20120826132801/http://zipcodezoo.com/Key/Animalia/Allotoma_Genus.asp

Bombycoidea
Macrolepidoptera genera
Monotypic moth genera
Moths of Asia